Messier 15 or M15 (also designated NGC 7078) is a globular cluster in the constellation Pegasus. It was discovered by Jean-Dominique Maraldi in 1746 and included in Charles Messier's catalogue of comet-like objects in 1764.  At an estimated 12.5±1.3 billion years old, it is one of the oldest known globular clusters.

Characteristics
M 15 is about 35,700 light-years from Earth, and 175 light-years in diameter. It has an absolute magnitude of −9.2, which translates to a total luminosity of 360,000 times that of the Sun. Messier 15 is one of the most densely packed globulars known in the Milky Way galaxy. Its core has undergone a contraction known as "core collapse" and it has a central density cusp with an enormous number of stars surrounding what may be a central black hole.

Home to over 100,000 stars, the cluster is notable for containing a large number of variable stars (112) and pulsars (8), including one double neutron star system, M15-C. It also contains Pease 1, the first planetary nebula discovered within a globular cluster in 1928. Just three others have been found in globular clusters since then.

Amateur astronomy
At magnitude 6.2, M15 approaches naked eye visibility under good conditions and can be observed with binoculars or a small telescope, appearing as a fuzzy star. Telescopes with a larger aperture (at least 6 in. (150 mm)) will start to reveal individual stars, the brightest of which are of magnitude +12.6. The cluster appears 18 arc minutes in size (three tenths of a degree across). M15 is 4.2° WNW of the brightest star of Pegasus, Epsilon Pegasi.

X-ray sources
Earth-orbiting satellites Uhuru and Chandra X-ray Observatory have detected two bright X-ray sources in this cluster: Messier 15 X-1 (4U 2129+12) and Messier 15 X-2. The former appears to be the first astronomical X-ray source detected in Pegasus.

Gallery

See also
 List of Messier objects
 X-ray astronomy

References

External links

 Messier 15, SEDS Messier pages
 Messier 15, Galactic Globular Clusters Database page
 Globular Cluster Photometry With the Hubble Space Telescope. V. WFPC Study of M15's Central density Cusp
 Wikisky.org SDSS image of M15
 
 

Messier 015
Messier 015
015
Messier 015
Astronomical X-ray sources
X-ray astronomy
17460907